Above All Laws is a 1948 American Western film starring William Bishop.

External links

Above all Laws at TCMDB

1948 films
American Western (genre) films
1940s English-language films
1948 Western (genre) films
American black-and-white films
1940s American films